Bob & Carol & Ted & Alice is an American sitcom broadcast in the United States by ABC as part of its 1973 fall lineup.  It was based on the 1969 movie of the same title. It was produced by Screen Gems. Only seven episodes were aired before the series was canceled.

Bob & Carol & Ted & Alice was of necessity somewhat different from the R-rated movie upon which it was based.  The film involved sexual liberation, and featured the (short-lived) desire of the two title couples to engage in extramarital affairs, mate-swapping and group sex, all of which would have been unacceptable on U.S. broadcast television in 1973 under the network's Division of Standards and Practices. However, the TV series depicted skinny dipping, premarital sex, and unmarried couples cohabiting, which were still thought by many to be racy topics for network television at the time. As with the film, Ted and Alice Henderson were more conservative than the "liberated" Bob and Carol Sanders. No members of the original film cast reprised their roles in the series.

Reception
Scheduled opposite CBS's Top 10 hit The Sonny & Cher Comedy Hour and NBC's Top 30 hit Adam-12, the series earned very low Nielsen ratings, and was canceled less than two months after its premiere.

The show is perhaps best remembered for featuring a then eleven-year-old Jodie Foster as Ted and Alice's daughter.  (This differed from the movie version where the characters had a son.)

Cast
Robert Urich as Bob Sanders
Anne Archer as Carol Sanders
David Spielberg as Ted Henderson
Anita Gillette as Alice Henderson
Brad Savage as Sean Sanders
Jodie Foster as Elizabeth Henderson

Episode list

*These episodes finally appeared on USA Cable Network, with the rest of the series, in 1984.

References
 Brooks, Tim and Marsh, Earle, The Complete Directory to Prime Time Network and Cable TV Shows

External links
 

1973 American television series debuts
1973 American television series endings
1970s American sitcoms
American Broadcasting Company original programming
Television shows set in Los Angeles
English-language television shows
Television series by Sony Pictures Television
Live action television shows based on films
Television series by Screen Gems